The spotted honeyeater (Xanthotis polygrammus) is a species of bird in the family Meliphagidae.

Distribution and habitat
It is found in Indonesia and Papua New Guinea.  Its natural habitat is subtropical or tropical moist lowland forests.

References

Xanthotis
Birds described in 1861
Taxonomy articles created by Polbot